Rear Admiral Joseph John "Jack" Dantone Jr. (born 6 August 1942) of U.S. Navy, was last director of Defense Mapping Agency (DMA) from May 1996 to September 1996. He was also the Acting Director of National Imagery and Mapping Agency (NIMA) from October 1996 to March 1998. He played a major role in transition of DMA into NIMA.

Early life and education
Born in Baltimore on 6 August 1942, Dantone graduated from the United States Naval Academy with a B.S. degree in Naval Engineering in 1964. Commissioned as an ensign and assigned to flight training, he was designated a naval aviator on 24 September 1965. Dantone later earned M.S. degrees in Aeronautical Engineering and Management at the Naval Postgraduate School. He received eighteen months of nuclear power training in 1981 and 1982.

Naval career
After completing flight training, Dantone was assigned to VF-84 flying the F-4 Phantom from the carrier  in the Mediterranean Sea. Transferred to VF-161, he next flew from the carrier  in Southeast Asia during the Vietnam War.

After completing his studies at the Naval Postgraduate School, Dantone was assigned to fly the F-14 Tomcat. Deployed with VF-1 aboard the carrier , he flew fighter cover during the evacuation of Saigon in early 1975. In July 1977, Dantone joined VF-14 flying from the carrier . On 7 April 1978, he became executive officer of the squadron. Dantone assumed command of the squadron on 6 July 1979, serving until 22 December 1980.

After completing his nuclear power training, Dantone served as executive officer of Enterprise from January 1983 to February 1985. He was next given command of the replenishment oiler  from 10 December 1985 to 12 March 1987. Assigned as the commanding officer of PCU Abraham Lincoln in November 1987, Dantone was reassigned before the new carrier could be commissioned. He was instead given command of the carrier Dwight D. Eisenhower on 27 September 1988, serving until 28 September 1990. She was deployed to the Red Sea during the Gulf War before Dantone left her in December 1990.

Promoted to rear admiral, Dantone served as the commanding officer of Carrier Group Three from April 1992 to March 1994.

Defense Mapping Agency
Rear Admiral Dantone led the NIMA transition team that established the mission, function, organizational structure and program plan for the new agency. He led the consolidation of resources from eight different agencies into the new agency after gaining the approval of Department of Defense, the intelligence community, and various oversight congressional committees.

On 28 November 1995, the Secretary of Defense, Director of Central Intelligence and Chairman, Joint Chiefs of Staff sent a joint letter to Congressional leaders and appropriate committees agreeing in concept to the establishment of a National Imagery and Mapping Agency (NIMA). The purpose of NIMA was to consolidate imagery and mapping resources and management, from eight different agencies, into a single agency within the Department of Defense (DoD) to improve the overall effectiveness and efficiency of imagery intelligence and mapping support to both national and military customers.

Dantone, then Deputy Director for Military Support, National Reconnaissance Office, was named Director of NIMA Implementation Team, and acting director of NIMA. Leo A. Hazlewood, then Deputy Director for Administration, Central Intelligence Agency, and Dr. Annette Krygiel, then Director, Central Imagery Office, were selected as Deputy Directors.

He was inducted into 2016 Geospatial Intelligence Hall of Fame.

Accolades, and decorations
Rear Admiral Dantone was inducted into 2016 Geospatial Intelligence Hall of Fame.
Dantone flew over 150 combat missions in Southeast Asia. His military decorations include:
 Defense Superior Service Medal
 Legion of Merit
 Meritorious Service Medal
 Air Medal with combat "V" with numeral "8" and one gold star
 Navy Commendation Medal with combat "V"
 Vietnam Service Medal
 Southwest Asia Service Medal
 Kuwait Liberation Medal
 National Intelligence Medal of Achievement

References

1942 births
Living people
People from Baltimore
United States Naval Academy alumni
United States Naval Aviators
United States Navy personnel of the Vietnam War
Recipients of the Air Medal
Naval Postgraduate School alumni
United States Navy admirals
United States Navy personnel of the Gulf War
Recipients of the Legion of Merit
Recipients of the Defense Superior Service Medal
Directors of the National Geospatial-Intelligence Agency
Recipients of the National Intelligence Medal of Achievement